Adorableness is an American comedy clip show that premiered on July 19, 2021. It is hosted by James Davis and co-hosted by Alyson Hannigan, Ross Mathews and Dulcé Sloan. The series is the third spin off of Ridiculousness.

Episodes

References

MTV original programming
2020s American video clip television series
2021 American television series debuts
American television spin-offs
Mass media about Internet culture
Television series about social media
Internet memes